is a Japanese manga series written and illustrated by Tomonori Inoue. The story follows three high school girls who were genetically engineered to be impervious to radioactivity and sent to Tokyo after the city was contaminated by a nuclear accident. It was serialized in Kodansha's seinen manga magazine Weekly Young Magazine from June 2008 to May 2012, and later in Monthly Young Magazine from May 2012 to February 2016, with its chapters collected in twenty-six tankōbon volumes.

An anime adaption by GoHands aired from October to December 2013 in Japan with a simulcast airing on the same day in Asia on Animax Asia. Viz Media has licensed the anime for streaming and home video release in North America.

Plot
In 2016, a catastrophe occurs after a nuclear meltdown from the nearby Odaiba nuclear power plant contaminates Tokyo, forcing the government to order its citizens to evacuate. Twenty years later, in the year 2036, Tokyo has now become a ghost town due to the high levels of radiation, because of which the government has banned entry for anyone. When a distress signal is received from Tokyo, the Japan Ground Self-Defense Force dispatches three teenage high school girls from the Dispatch 3rd Special Force Coppelion, who comprise the "Healthcare Team". Due to genetic engineering, the Coppelions are immune to radiation while also possessing special skills. Thus the Coppelions journey to the ruined capital to find survivors.

Characters
 

 The leader of the Coppelion Rescue Unit who possesses superhuman strength and enhanced athletic capabilities, and is a very accurate shooter with guns. She is a kind person, as indicated by her ready desire to help people and her reckless usage of the panacea "Ether" in saving those affected by the radiation. Although she initially used to take nutrient injections in place of consuming food like Haruto, she tasted a rice cake and appreciated normal food, consuming normal food after that, again like Haruto. She is the only character to speak in a Kansai dialect. In episode 11 of the anime, it is hinted that there might be a relationship between her and Haruto.
 
 
 A happy-go-lucky member of the Coppelion Rescue Unit, Aoi is a good listener who's always willing to hear other's problems. She used to be bullied by the Ozu sisters back in school, leading to her intense fear of them. She possesses an escapist mindset, locking herself up in a storeroom of the Planet in her belief that she impedes everyone else's work. She takes a liking to the robot, Nosense, a guide to the Planet. She apparently possesses psychic abilities to the extent of levitation and force-field generation, but lacks any fine control over them. Under such conditions, her physical strength is increased but her memory shuts down during those incidents.
 
 
 A member of the Coppelion Rescue Unit who possesses heightened senses, especially eyesight, so much so that she has to wear special eyewear in order to tune down her enhanced vision. She befriends a feral dog during their mission. She is medically trained to some extent and has performed surgeries on Naruse Ibara when she was injured and has also helped in delivering Ibuki's child, although she was walked through the process by Granny Ayame.
 
 
 A member of the Cleanup Crew, the Coppelion Combat Unit. He is skilled in the use of guns and explosives as well as the art of making new ones. He initially possesses an aversion to "normal" humans, after being counseled by Ibara, Aoi and Taeko, he develops a curiosity towards humans. In the penultimate episode, when Gojiro asks him why he helps humans, he answers "... we need you", and near the end of episode 11, there is an indication of a relationship between him and Ibara. He is thought to be dead.
 
 
 The elder sister of the Ozu Twins and member of the Coppelion Combat Unit. Kanon possesses the DNA of an electric eel which allows her to emit electricity from her body. The Ozu sisters are murderous psychopaths as the human they were cloned from was a famous actress who was also secretly a serial killer. She is afraid of going near water as she can electrocute herself.
 
 
 The younger sister of the Ozu Twins and member of the Coppelion Combat Unit. She possesses strong bones and superhuman strength which even surpasses that of Ibara.
 
 
 A JGSDF colonel and the Coppelion's vice principal. He lost his wife and daughter from the nuclear meltdown.
 
 
 A scientist working with the JGSDF. He is portly and likes eating, to the extent that Vice Principal Onihei can extract favors from him by bribing him with promises of sushi.

Media

Manga

Coppelion, written and illustrated by Tomonori Inoue, was serialized in Kodansha's Weekly Young Magazine from June 9, 2008, to May 7, 2012. It was then transferred to Monthly Young Magazine, being serialized from May 9, 2012, to February 20, 2016. The manga's last chapter was drawn live in a free seminar at the Vantan Game Academy in Osaka, on November 22, 2015. Kodansha collected its chapters in twenty-six tankōbon volumes, released from October 6, 2008, to April 6, 2016.

The manga was available in English on Crunchyroll from 2013 until 2018.

Anime
In September 2010, the 40th issue of Weekly Young Magazine announced that an anime television adaption of the manga was greenlighted, but due to the Fukushima Daiichi nuclear disaster, production of the anime was put on hold. The anime was later revived in 2013 and produced by Studio GoHands which aired from October 2, 2013, to December 25, 2013. The anime was also simulcasted aired in Asia on the same day as Japan by Animax Asia and licensed by Viz Media for North America on their online streaming service, Viz Anime, and also for home video release on 2014. Both the opening theme song "Angel" and the ending theme song  are sung by angela. A second theme song, "Bye Bye All Right" by angela was used for the 13th episode.

Episode list

See also
 Candy and Cigarettes, another manga series by the same author

References

External links
  
 Official anime website 
 

2008 manga
2013 anime television series debuts
Action anime and manga
Anime series based on manga
GoHands
Kodansha manga
Manga series
Military anime and manga
Post-apocalyptic anime and manga
Seinen manga
Viz Media anime